Laguna is a station on Line 6 of the Madrid Metro. It is located in Zone A. The station offers connection to Cercanías Madrid via Laguna railway station.

References 

Line 6 (Madrid Metro) stations
Railway stations in Spain opened in 1983